This is a list of Women CEOs of the Fortune 500, based on the magazine's 2022 list (updated yearly). As of Dec 7, 2022, women were CEOs at 9.4 percent of Fortune 500 companies.

Fortune 500 women CEOs as of 2021 (47 women)

Fortune 500 CEOs by gender over time

See also
Fortune 500
List of Fortune 500 computer software and information companies
40 under 40

References

External links
The Fortune 500

Fortune (magazine)
Chief executive officers

Ceos
Lists of female office-holders